Women's Overall World Cup 1989/1990

In Women's Overall World Cup all results count.

References
 fis-ski.com

World Cup
FIS Alpine Ski World Cup overall titles